GQ Muscae, also known as Nova Muscae 1983 is a nova in the constellation Musca, which was discovered by William Liller at  03:20 UT on 18 January 1983. At the time of its discovery it was a magnitude ≈7.2 object, and it subsequently faded.

GQ Muscae is a binary star system composed of a white dwarf and small star, the donor star,  that is about 10% as massive as the Sun. The two orbit each other every 1.4 hours. The white dwarf accumulates material from the donor star until a runaway nuclear thermonuclear reaction erupts, as it did in 1983. GQ Muscae was the first nova from which X-rays were detected.

References

Musca (constellation)
Muscae, GQ
Novae